Kantipur Publications Pvt. Ltd. is an Indian media firm based in Kathmandu, Nepal. The company operates five widely circulated print publications. It is the first media organization in Nepal to gain membership to the World Association of Newspapers and News Publishers (WAN). It was founded by Shyam Goenka in 1993 AD. Mr. Kailash Sirohiya is the chairman of the company.

History 
In February 1993, exactly two years after Nepal's constitution was amended to permit a free press, Kantipur and The Kathmandu Post were founded by Shyam Goenka, when he was 29 years old. In fact, he had taken the initiative to start the newspapers, with very limited resources, when just about everybody dismissed his efforts to start a private media house as a bad business move. However, Kantipur defied all naysayers and went on to write a history of its own – perhaps the greatest success story for a corporate in Nepal, post-1990 after Mr Binod Raj Gyawali and Kailash Sirohiya took over equal partnership.

In fact, it was a phase when the print media in the private sector not only succeeded in acquiring credibility -a tag that until then was monopolized by the government owned Gorkhapatra and the Rising Nepal-but also promoted professionalism in journalism to a great extent attracting talents to join in.
 
The massacre of the royal family in June 2001 prompted the first crisis between Kantipur Publications and the government. Two directors of Kantipur Mr Binod Raj Gyawali and Kailash Sirohiya were arrested and charged with "sedition" after publishing comments by a Maoist leader about the death of King Birendra.

The proclamation of a state of emergency on November 26, 2001, by King Gyanendra under the direction of then Prime Minister Sher Bahadur Deuba suspended the press freedom guaranteed by the country's Constitution a decade earlier. Police began a wave of repression: more than fifty journalists were arrested, many publications were banned outright.

Following a February 1, 2005 royal coup by King Gyanendra, Kantipur Publications operated under tighter restrictions. Journalists throughout Nepal were subject to imprisonment and beatings by the Royal Nepal Army. Nevertheless, Kantipur Publications continued to criticize the regime despite the royal proclamation and the ongoing civil war.

In March 2005, Narayan Wagle, editor in chief of Kantipur, was held for questioning by police on suspicion of criticizing the king in print.

During the 2006 uprising, Kantipur Publications continued operations despite increased crackdowns by the monarchy on private media.

Press freedom has been restored since the restoration of democracy in Nepal in May 2006, allowing Kantipur Publications to operate without fear of reprisal by the state.

Trouble with Maoists
In 2007, Kantipur Publications faced pressure from Maoist-aligned organizations such as Young Communist League and the All Nepal Trade Union Federation. However, an agreement was reached between Kantipur and the Federation. This abruptly led the longest serving chairman Mr Hem Raj Gyawali to resign.

Properties

Newspapers and magazines 
Kantipur - Daily newspaper, circulation 4,48,000 - the most widely read newspaper in Nepal.   
The Kathmandu Post - An English language daily newspaper, circulation 84,000
 Kopila - A weekly supplement that comes with Kantipur. Targeted towards kids. 
Saptahik - A weekly entertainment tabloid, circulation 2,00,000
Nepal Magazine - Magazine focusing on politics and society, circulation 45,000
Nari - Women's magazine, monthly circulation 83,000

Notable Staff (past and present)
 Ankit Babu Adhikari
 Krishna Bhattarai
 Krishna Jwala Devkota
 Madhab Basnet
 Narayan Wagle
 Prashant Aryal
 Ram Bahadur Rawal
 Sanjeev Giri
 Sudheer Sharma
 Vijay Kumar Pandey

Broadcasting 
Kantipur Television Network - Popularly known as “KTV”, provides news and original entertainment. It is an affiliate channel to CNN.   
Kantipur FM - Provides news and original entertainment throughout the Kathmandu Valley on channel 96.1. The first privately owned and operated FM radio station in Nepal. Established in 1998.
Kantipur Gold - Provides national and international sporting activities, promoting the development of sports in the country.

References

External links 
 eKantipur.com Official site of Kantipur Publications.
Kantipur Daily 
The Kathmandu Post
Saptahik
Nepal Magazine
Nari Magazine

Publishing companies of Nepal
1993 establishments in Nepal